Laurens van Rooyen (Utrecht, 27 March 1935) is a Dutch pianist and composer. He is known for his cooperation in the theater with Herman van Veen. He composed many pieces for the piano and wrote the score for several Dutch films. He wrote two books on his experiences as a musician.

Biography 
Laurens Johannes van Rooyen was born in Utrecht, Netherlands, as the oldest son of a grocer. After grammar school he studied at the Utrecht Conservatory of Music, where he met with Herman van Veen. With him he founded in 1966 the Harlekijn Muziektheater. They wrote songs and performed together.

In 1976 he released his first solo album: Kaleidoskoop. Ever since he continues to publish records with various record companies. In the nineties he was also involved in the production of several Dutch films.

In 1978 Van Rooyen toured the Netherlands and Belgium, with musicians like guitarist Jan Akkerman. Together with Louis van Dijk, Tonny Eyk, Pim Jacobs, Pieter van Vollenhoven and Daniel Wayenberg he established in 1988 a companionship by the name of de Gevleugelde Vrienden(Winged Friends. 'Vleugel' meaning Wing as well as Grand Piano). They gave more than forty-five concerts throughout the Netherlands.

Since the turn of the century Van Rooyen gives frequently piano recitals in the castles and coach houses along the river Vecht. He also performs for special occasions as anniversaries and jubilees. In 2004 he was commissioned a composition for the occasion of the 750th anniversary of the Cathedral of Utrecht. He also toured the theaters with De Verdwenen Minnares (The Lost Mistress), 2005, a musical ode to romance. Together with Geert Huinink he composed the Dance Opera Orfeo. This premiered at the opening of the Amsterdam Dance Event in 2005. Van Rooyen is the author of two books. In 2015 his most recent: Beethoven was ook een zzp'er (Beethoven was a freelancer, too).

Honors and awards 
In 1983 Van Rooyen was awarded the Golden Harp by Buma Culture Foundation. In 2014, Laurens van Rooyen received a royal decoration: Knight in the Order of the Netherlands Lion.

Discography

Europe (releases 1976-2016)

Japan (releases 2011-2016)

South-Korea

Bibliography

Books 
 Brieven aan een wonderkind – bespiegelingen over muziek, geluk, succes, glamour en het betrekkelijke van dit alles (Letters to a prodigy - reflections on music, happiness, success, glamour and the relativity of it all), Het Spectrum, 1993. 
 Beethoven was ook een zzp'er, Leporello Uitgevers, 2015.

Books for Piano 
 Water
 Flowers for a lady (Never Say Goodbye, Flowers For a Lady, Sunset Serenade, Friendship, To Love You Is To Live, Reflections, Strawberries for Breakfast, Only Then, Mother and Son, Tea With Claire)
 Inspiration
 La Grande Parade
 Visage
 Traveller
 Play it Easy (Play It Easy, I’ve No Time Today, The Moon Is A Balloon, On Top Of The World, Three Generations, The Tango, Blues For Charlotte, The Last Waltz, Sunshine)
 Rêverie 1, 2
 Serenata
 Songs for Piano

Orchestral music 
 De Geest van Laat Maar Waaien (The Spirit of Laissez-faire), a symphonic fairy tale about young people and the environment, text by Robert Long.
 De Verdwenen Minnares, a theater performance with Sanna Dia, voice and Sonja Volten, dance.
 De Domcantate, for the occasion of the 750th anniversary of the Cathedral of Utrecht (Dom), text by Ina Brouwer. The cantata was performed with the Toonkunstkoor and Henk Westbroek as narrator.
 De Rabocantate, a special commission for the farewell of the director of 'Rabo Utrecht' Ko van der Maas. Text: Ina Brouwer with the cooperation of the Toonkunstkoor and narrator Henk Westbroek.
 Dance Opera Orfeo, a cross-over of Electronic dance music, classical music and opera. Performed by dance group ISH (multidisciplinary theater) and Porgy Franssen as narrator. Premiere October 2005, as opening of the Amsterdam Dance Event.
 De Bosporus Suite, a co-production with Foundation Kulsan Amsterdam who brings Turkish classical music to the Dutch theaters. Van Rooyen incorporated old Turkish and Greek instruments in the composition: the Ney and the Oud.
 Let’s Twitter, a symphony, commissioned by Achmea and performed at the congress de Pensioen Expeditie on 21 November 2012 in cooperation with the Amsterdam Student Orchestra. In 2013 a simplified arrangement was made for het Amsterdamse Leerorkest.

Film scores 
 Een Vlucht Regenwulpen (A Flight Rainbirds)
 Rembrandt fecit 1669
 Eline Vere
 Een vrouw als Eva (A Woman Like Eve)
 Serengeti Symphonie
 Brandende Liefde
 Mysteries
 Lieve jongens (Dear Boys)
 Affair Play

Musical Theater 
Menthol, a musical composed in 2016, was commissioned by the Twente region. Van Rooyen wrote the piece together with composer Paul Maaswinkel. Menthol tells the story of the pioneer Joseph Sylvester, the first black man in Hengelo, who sold toothpaste in the 1920s and married a local girl.

Radio 
Laurens van Rooyen's music can be heard regularly on radio stations in the United States, Japan, South Africa and Australia. The Japanese program ‘Radio Midnight Express’ daily plays 'Imaginary Landscapes' as its tune.

References

External links

Living people
1935 births
Dutch pianists
Dutch composers
Musicians from Utrecht (city)
21st-century pianists